Frank Signorelli (May 24, 1901 – December 9, 1975) was an American jazz pianist.

Biography
Signorelli was born to an Italian Sicilian family in New York City, New York.

Signorelli was a founding member of the Original Memphis Five in 1917, then joined the Original Dixieland Jazz Band briefly in 1921. In 1927, he played in Adrian Rollini's New York ensemble, and subsequently worked with Eddie Lang, Bix Beiderbecke, Matty Malneck and Paul Whiteman. In 1935 he was part of Dick Stabile's All-America "Swing" Band. In 1936-38, he played in the revived version of the Original Dixieland Jazz Band. He recorded with Phil Napoleon in 1946 and with Miff Mole in 1958.

Compositions
As a songwriter, Signorelli composed "'I'll Never Be The Same" (initially called "Little Buttercup" by Joe Venuti's Blue Four), "Gypsy", recorded by Paul Whiteman and his Orchestra, "Caprice Futuristic", "Evening", "Anything", "Bass Ale Blues", "Great White Way Blues", "Park Avenue Fantasy", "Sioux City Sue" (1924), "Shufflin' Mose", "Stairway to the Stars", and "A Blues Serenade", recorded by Signorelli in 1926, Glenn Miller and his Orchestra in 1935 and Duke Ellington's version in 1938.

Death
Signorelli died in New York City on December 9, 1975.

References

External links
 Frank Signorelli (1901-1975) at Red Hot Jazz Archive
 Frank Signorelli recordings at the Discography of American Historical Recordings.

1901 births
1975 deaths
Dixieland pianists
American people of Italian descent
American jazz musicians
20th-century American musicians
The Dorsey Brothers members
Original Memphis Five members
Original Dixieland Jass Band members